Jacqueline Nolte Liwai Pung (December 13, 1921 – March 15, 2017) was an American professional golfer who played on the LPGA Tour.

Pung was born in Honolulu, Hawaii. Her mother was Jacqueline Nolte. Her father was Jack Liwai, who was originally trained as a musician, but worked as a nurse for the grandson of shipping magnate Samuel Gardner Wilder.
She won the Hawaiian Women's Amateur four times between 1937 and 1948. She won the 1952 U.S. Women's Amateur.

Pung won five times on the LPGA Tour between 1953 and 1958.

Pung is best known for the tournament she did not win. In the 1957 U.S. Women's Open, she appeared to have beaten Betsy Rawls by one stroke when it was discovered that she had signed an incorrect scorecard and was disqualified. Both she and her playing partner, Betty Jameson, had recorded 5s on the fourth hole when in fact both had made 6s. Although both players had signed for the correct total score, they were both disqualified. The fans, officials, and members of Winged Foot Golf Club, where the tournament was held, took up a collection for Pung and presented her with over $3,000 (the winner's share was only $1,800).

Pung was inducted into the Hawaii Golf Hall of Fame in 1988.

She died March 15, 2017, at Life Care Center of Kona on Hawaii's Big Island, according to family members. She was 95.

Amateur wins
1937 Hawaiian Women's Amateur
1938 Hawaiian Women's Amateur
1939 Hawaiian Women's Amateur
1948 Hawaiian Women's Amateur
1952 U.S. Women's Amateur

LPGA Tour wins (5)
1953 (2) Palm Springs Open, Triangle Round Robin
1955 (2) Sea Island Open, Jacksonville Open
1958 (1) Jackson Open

References

American female golfers
LPGA Tour golfers
Winners of ladies' major amateur golf championships
Golfers from Honolulu
1921 births
2017 deaths
21st-century American women